The Pomona Raceway (known as In-N-Out Burger Pomona Dragstrip for commercial reasons, previously Auto Club Raceway at Pomona), is a racing facility located in Pomona, California that features a quarter-mile dragstrip. Since its opening in 1961, the dragstrip has hosted the NHRA's Winternationals event – the traditional season opener – and since 2021, the season's last race, the NHRA Finals. These two events have contributed to its becoming perhaps one of the most famous dragstrips in North America. The facility has a seating capacity of 40,000 spectators, and it is one of the few dragstrips in the USA that is operated directly by the NHRA. This dragstrip has also gone by the nickname of The Fairplex, in reference to its location at the Fairplex, formerly called the Los Angeles County Fairgrounds.

History

Drag Racing
In 1952, a car club known as the "Choppers of Pomona" aided by a young police officer, Sergeant Bud Coons, advocated that a safe place should be provided for local area drag racers. Coons, along with fellow hot rod enthusiast, Pomona Police Chief Ralph Parker, and the city government of Pomona asked to lease the parking lot of the LA County Fairgrounds. Coons and Parker were instrumental in convincing the county to allow the use of the fairgrounds for the race by citing statistics that indicated deaths among kids declined sharply when given a supervised place to race. The county finally agreed, as long as the hot rodders would provide their own insurance, which they were able to do with gate receipts.

At the time the county made the agreement, the parking lot was nothing but a gravel lot. The coalition of hot rodders, police and community leaders raised funds through donations and paved the lot. This was the birth of the dragstrip in Pomona.

Though it was not considered a national event by today's standards, the very first NHRA event, the Southern California Championships, was held at this dragstrip on an April weekend in 1953. On Saturday, attendance was at two or three thousand and attendance was reported to be at 15,000 on Sunday. Compared to the 3.9 second numbers (at  the pros are putting on the board presently, the best ET of that day was a respectable 10.93.

In 1961, NHRA held its first ever Winternationals at the Pomona Raceway. It became NHRA's second national event. The first NHRA national event was the U.S. Nationals, which was nicknamed the "Big-Go". Thus, the Winternationals got nicknamed the "Big-Go West". It has remained at this location ever since. For many years, this event was sponsored by Chief Auto Parts and later its successor AutoZone, but later was sponsored by CSK Automotive, and now its current successor, O'Reilly Auto Parts.

2008 saw Top fuel & funny car races be reduced to the present 1000 feet.

The season closer, the NHRA Finals, was brought to the facility in 1984 from the now defunct Orange County International Raceway. When the event was first brought to Pomona, the event was sponsored by Winston (after NHRA's main title sponsor at the time, RJ Reynolds' "Winston" cigarette brand). From 2010-19, and again from 2021-22, the event was sponsored by the Automobile Club of Southern California, which is affiliated with AAA.  The 2020 event was sponsored by Stellantis and Royal Dutch Shell when it was held at Las Vegas Motor Speedway because Clark County, Nevada allowed spectators when California still banned mass gatherings because of the global pandemic.  Beginning in 2023, In-N-Out Burger will become naming rights sponsor for both the circuit and the NHRA Finals.

Other Racing
From 1934 to 1937 a  mile dirt oval was located at the facility. The dirt oval was once again opened in the 1950s but closed in 1959. Pomona was also home to a 1.7 mile paved road course which operated in 1998 and 1999. From 1956 to 1961, a 2-mile temporary road course was located in the parking lot.

Winners

NHRA Winternationals

Note: In 2021 The race was postponed due to COVID-19 unit July 30th - Ang 1st 2021.

NHRA Finals

NOTE:  The Finals has been held in the Southwest area from 1965-73, the Los Angeles metropolitan area from 1974-2019, and again since 2021, and Las Vegas in 2020.

References

External links
 
 NHRA's Official Site

NHRA Division 7 drag racing venues
Motorsport venues in California
Sports venues in Los Angeles County, California
Buildings and structures in Pomona, California
Sports in Pomona, California